The  is a DC electric multiple unit (EMU) train type operated by the East Japan Railway Company (JR East). It began operations in the Chiba area on 13 March 2021, on the Sagami Line on 18 November 2021, and on the Nikkō Line and the Utsunomiya Line on 12 March 2022. The trains are equipped for driver-only operation.

Design 
The E131 series trains have stainless steel bodies. They have LCD passenger information displays above the doors, as well as wheelchair-accessible and stroller-accessible "free spaces" on all cars. As they are equipped for "wanman" driver-only operation, body-mounted cameras are utilized to monitor passengers boarding and alighting the train; these cameras are then fed to displays located in the driver's cab. They also feature semi-automatic doors, allowing passengers to operate the doors during driver-only operation.

Internally, the trains are equipped with security cameras and emergency call switches.

Some trains in each subseries are numbered -X80, as they have a slightly different equipment configuration due to the presence of track monitoring equipment.

Variants 
 E131-0/-80 series: 2-car sets used on the Kashima Line, Narita Line, Sotobō Line, and Uchibō Line
 E131-500/-580 series: 4-car sets used on the Sagami Line (previously also used on Yokohama Line through services)
 E131-600/-680 series: 3-car sets used on the Nikkō Line and Utsunomiya Line

History 
The series and its scheduled introduction into the Sotobō Line (Kazusa-Ichinomiya Station - Awa-Kamogawa Station), Uchibō Line (Kisarazu Station - Awa-Kamogawa Station), and Kashima Line (Sawara Station - Kashimajingū Station) was announced on 5 May 2020. It was the first all-new series introduced in the region in 51 years since the 113 series in the late 1960s; the previous 211 series and 209 series were transferred from other lines. On 18 December 2020, it was further announced that the series would operate certain services in the Narita Line (between Narita Station and Katori Station) and Kashima Line (between Katori Station and Sawara Station).

On 17 June 2021, JR East announced that a new subseries will be introduced on the Sagami Line (Chigasaki Station - Hashimoto Station) in fall 2021, and another subseries will be introduced into the Nikkō Line (Utsunomiya Station - Nikkō Station) and the Utsunomiya Line (Oyama Station - Kuroiso Station) in Spring 2022.

E131-0/-80 series 

A total of 12 two-car sets were ordered and built. Test runs began in July 2020, starting with the first two delivered sets R01 and R02. The first ten sets (R01–R10) entered passenger service on 13 March 2021.

The trains are painted in the Uchibo/Sotobo Line color scheme and formed as two-car sets with four doors per car.

Lines served 
The series serves the following sections of lines:
 Sotobō Line: Kazusa-Ichinomiya Station - Awa-Kamogawa Station
 Uchibō Line: Kisarazu Station - Awa-Kamogawa Station
 Kashima Line: Katori Station - Kashimajingū Station
 Narita Line: Narita Station - Katori Station

Formations 
, 12 two-car sets (R01–R12) are based at Makuhari Rolling Stock Centre in Chiba Prefecture and formed with 1 motored ("M") car and 1 trailer ("T") car.

 The KuMoHa E131 car has a single-arm pantograph.
 Both cars have an accessible/priority "free space".
 The KuHa E130 car has a universal design toilet.

Interior 
Passenger accommodation consists of a combination of longitudinal and transverse seating. Priority seating and wheelchair- and stroller-accessible "free spaces" are provided in each car. KuHa E130 features a universal design toilet.

Fleet details 

The table below shows the details of each set.

Sets R11 and R12 are fitted with track monitoring equipment.

E131-500/-580 series 

A total of 12 four-car trains were built for the Sagami Line; the first set (G-01) entered service on 18 November 2021. It replaced the existing 205-500 series trains that have been in service since 1991.

These trains were also used on through services between the Sagami Line and Yokohama Line during the morning and evening rush; these services ended on 11 March 2022.

Lines served 
The series serves the following sections of lines:
 Sagami Line: Chigasaki Station - Hashimoto Station
 Yokohama Line: Hashimoto Station - Hachiōji Station (until 11 March 2022)

Formations 
, twelve four-car sets (G-01–G-12) are based at Kōzu Depot in Kanagawa Prefecture and formed with 2 motored ("M") cars and 2 trailer ("T") cars. Sets G-11 and G-12 are fitted with track monitoring equipment.

 Cars 2 and 4 each have a single-arm pantograph.
 All cars have an accessible/priority "free space".
 Car 3 is designated as a mildly air-conditioned car.

Interior 
Passenger accommodation consists of longitudinal seating throughout. Priority seating and wheelchair- and stroller-accessible "free spaces" are provided in each car.

E131-600/-680 series 

A total of 15 three-car trains were built for the Nikkō Line and Utsunomiya Line. The first fourteen sets (TN1–TN14) entered service on 12 March 2022. It replaced the existing 205-600 series trains that have been in service since 2013.

Lines served 
The series serves the following sections of lines:
 Nikkō Line: Utsunomiya Station - Nikkō Station
 Utsunomiya Line: Oyama Station - Kuroiso Station

Formations 
, 15 three-car sets (TN1–TN15) are based at Oyama Depot in Tochigi Prefecture and formed with 2 motored ("M") cars and 1 trailer ("T") car (the MoHa E131 car has one motorized bogie and one trailer bogie). Sets TN14 and TN15 are fitted with track monitoring equipment.

 The KuMoHa E131 car has two single-arm pantographs, while the MoHa E131 car has one.
 All cars have an accessible/priority "free space".
 The KuHa E130 car has a universal design toilet.

References 

Electric multiple units of Japan
East Japan Railway Company
Train-related introductions in 2021
1500 V DC multiple units of Japan
J-TREC multiple units